The Bundesstraße 75 (or B 75) is a German federal highway running in a northeast to southwest direction from the Lübeck borough of Travemünde to Delmenhorst near Bremen.

The highway goes through the Herren Tunnel under the Trave river just shy of its northeastern terminus. It formerly crossed a drawbridge that the tunnel replaced.

See also 
 Transport in Hamburg

External links 

075
B075
B075
B075
B075